The 1966 Atlanta Braves season was the first for the franchise in Atlanta, following their relocation from Milwaukee, where the team had played the previous 13 seasons while also the 96th season overall. The Braves finished their inaugural year in Atlanta in fifth place in the National League with a record of 85–77, ten games behind the Los Angeles Dodgers. The Braves played their first season of home games at Atlanta Stadium.  The home attendance for the season was 1,539,801, sixth in the ten-team

Offseason 
 November 29, 1965: Jesse Gonder was drafted from the Braves by the Pittsburgh Pirates in the 1965 rule 5 draft.
 January 29, 1966: Tom Seaver was drafted by the Braves in the secondary phase of the 1966 Major League Baseball draft, but the pick was voided.

Regular season 
 July 3, 1966: Tony Cloninger became the first National League player—and, as of 2022, the only pitcher—to hit two grand slams in one game.
 September 11, 1966: Rookie pitcher Pat Jarvis of the Braves became the first of 5,714 strikeout victims of Nolan Ryan's career.

Opening day
The Atlanta Braves' first-ever game was played at home, at Atlanta–Fulton County Stadium, on Tuesday, April 12, 1966, against the Pittsburgh Pirates before 50,671 fans. Braves' starting pitcher Cloninger, a 24-game winner in Milwaukee in 1965, pitched a 13-inning complete game but absorbed a hard-luck,  With the game tied at one in the top of the 13th, future hall of famer Willie Stargell hit a two-out, two-run home run to put Pittsburgh ahead 3–1. Atlanta catcher Joe Torre hit his second solo homer of the game to narrow the deficit to one run, but the Pirates held on to win. Earlier, in the fifth inning, Torre had hit the first homer in Atlanta's major league history.

Starting lineup

Season standings

Record vs. opponents

Front-office and managerial turnover
The Braves' first year in Atlanta featured an unusual amount of management churn in both the front office and dugout.  On June 28, it was announced that Paul Richards, a veteran former MLB manager and general manager, would join the team as a roving troubleshooter in its farm system.  The Braves were then a disappointing 34–42 (.447) and in eighth place in the ten-team National League. Braves president and GM John McHale remarked that Richards, 57, was poised to assume greater responsibilities within the Atlanta organization if called upon, leading to speculation that he would replace embattled field manager Bobby Bragan. More than a quarter-century earlier, in 1938, Richards had begun his management career as the successful player-manager of the minor league Atlanta Crackers.

Hitchcock's hiring would pull the Braves out of their tailspin, and they won 33 of 51 games (.647), advancing to fifth place. But Richards was indeed destined to rise within the Atlanta organization. On August 31, he was named director of player personnel at both the Major and minor-league levels, effectively becoming general manager of baseball operations without the formal title, which McHale temporarily retained. Four months later, McHale resigned from the Braves to join the office of Commissioner of Baseball William Eckert, and on January 11, 1967, Richards was formally named Braves' general manager. He would serve in the post through June 1, 1972.

National transactions 
 April 4, 1966: Marty Keough was purchased by the Braves from the Cincinnati Reds.
 April 5, 1966: Frank Thomas was placed on waivers by the Braves.
 April 28, 1966: Billy Cowan was traded by the Braves to the Chicago Cubs for future Braves manager Bobby Cox and cash.
 May 29, 1966: Marty Keough was traded by the Braves to the Chicago Cubs for John Herrnstein. Arnold Earley was also purchased.
 June 7, 1966: Al Santorini was drafted by the Braves in the 1st round (11th pick) of the 1966 Major League Baseball draft.

Roster

Player stats

Batting

Starters by position 
Note: Pos = Position; G = Games played; AB = At bats; H = Hits; Avg. = Batting average; HR = Home runs; RBI = Runs batted in

Other batters 
Note: G = Games played; AB = At bats; H = Hits; Avg. = Batting average; HR = Home runs; RBI = Runs batted in

Pitching

Starting pitchers 
Note: G = Games pitched; IP = Innings pitched; W = Wins; L = Losses; ERA = Earned run average; SO = Strikeouts

Other pitchers 
Note: G = Games pitched; IP = Innings pitched; W = Wins; L = Losses; ERA = Earned run average; SO = Strikeouts

Relief pitchers 
Note: G = Games pitched; W = Wins; L = Losses; SV = Saves; ERA = Earned run average; SO = Strikeouts

Farm system 

LEAGUE CHAMPIONS: Austin

Notes

References 

1966 Atlanta Braves season at Baseball Reference

Atlanta Braves seasons
Atlanta Braves season
Atlanta Braves